Philippines competed at the 1993 World Championships in Athletics in Stuttgart, Germany, from August 13 to 22, 1993. The Philippines fielded 2 athletes who competed in 3 events.

Results

Women
Track and road events

Field events

References

Nations at the 1993 World Championships in Athletics
1993
World Championships in Athletics